Sefidshahr  (formerly, Nasrabad  (Persian:   نصر آباد مركزي), also Romanized as Naşrābād ) is a city in the Central District of Aran va Bidgol County, Isfahan Province, Iran.  At the 2006 census, its population was 5,151, in 1,249 families.

References

Populated places in Aran va Bidgol County

Cities in Isfahan Province